The 1998 West Oxfordshire District Council election took place on 7 May 1998 to elect members of West Oxfordshire District Council in Oxfordshire, England. One third of the council was up for election and the council stayed under no overall control.

After the election, the composition of the council was
Conservative 14
Independent 13
Liberal Democrats 12
Labour 10

Background
Before the election there were 15 independent councillors, the Liberal Democrats had 14 seats, Labour had 11 and the Conservatives had 9. An alliance between the Liberal Democrats and the Labour party controlled the council with a majority of one seat.

Among the councillors who stood down at the election was independent David Walker, who had quit the Conservatives in the early 1990s over the poll tax, as well as Patrick Madden, Peg McWilliam, Elizabeth Mortimer and Susan Swann. 49 candidates stood for the 18 seats that were contested in 1998, including one candidate from the Green party, with the Liberal Democrats defending the most seats at eight.

Election result
The Conservatives became the largest group on the council after gaining five seats.

Ward results

References

1998 English local elections
1998
20th century in Oxfordshire